Raffaele Borea Ricci d'Olmo was an Italian naval officer with the rank of vice admiral (viceammiraglio). He was the first Italian governor of Tripolitania, then still counter admiral (contrammiraglio), although he de facto ruled only the city of Tripoli, during the first days of the Italian invasion of the colony from October 5 to 13, 1911.

1857 births
1942 deaths
Italian colonial governors and administrators
Italian military personnel of the Italo-Turkish War
People from Albenga